Anthony Inglis, (1813–1884) was a Scottish journeyman blacksmith, engineer and shipbuilder who set-up and managed the well known shipyard A. & J. Inglis in Pointhouse Glasgow together with his brother John Inglis.

Career 

In 1837 he founded a company to provide smithwork especially to shipbuilders, from premises in Anderston. In 1847 his younger brother, John Inglis (1819–1888), joined him, who had learned the craft of marine engineering and whose practicable skills added another dimension to the company. Together they founded the company A. & J. Inglis in 1847.

They moved to larger premises in Warroch Street, Anderston, where they began to focus on marine work. In 1850 they obtained their first major marine contract, to supply the machinery for the tug ‘Clyde’. From then onwards the company grew in strength and rapidly earned a reputation for ability and at least equality to much larger and longer established firms. In 1855, the Inglis brothers provided the machinery of the large screw steamer Tasmanian, one of the largest and fastest vessels built up until that date. The success of the ‘Tasmanian’ caught the attention of William Mac Kinnon who established the British India Steam Navigation Company and the Imperial British East Africa Company. From that moment the name Inglis became synonymous with fine design and engineering. Success followed success and before long the Warroch Street premises had to be extended to cope with the increased scope of work and award of contracts.

In 1862, the Inglis brothers decided to add shipbuilding to their engineering repertoire and for this purpose acquired an area of land in Glasgow at the confluence of the River Kelvin with the River Clyde, on which the Pointhouse Yard had existed since 1845 under ownership of Thomas B. Seath. The site was limited in size but it became an extremely important and credible shipyard run by the Inglis family to exceptionally high standards. From this Yard there came many classic designs and creations of maritime beauty and success, along with the normal workmanlike dredgers, tugs, coasters, barges, tankers and whalers. After the death of Anthony Inglis in 1884 his son John Inglis took over the management of the family firm.

Further information

References 

1813 births
1884 deaths
Scottish engineers
Scottish shipbuilders
Defunct shipbuilding companies of Scotland
Marine engine manufacturers
Engine manufacturers of the United Kingdom
19th-century Scottish businesspeople